The Škoda 110R was a rear-engined, rear-wheel drive car that was produced by Czechoslovakian manufacturer AZNP in Kvasiny, between 1970 and 1980. During those ten years, a total of 56,902 coupés were made.

The 110R Coupé succeeded the sporty Škoda 1000 MBX/1100 MBX. It was powered by an uprated  SAE,  (DIN) version of Škoda's 720-type OHV four-cylinder 1.1-litre (1107 cc) engine (this same engine was shared with the Škoda 110LS saloon, following its introduction in 1971).

Its design closely mirrored that of the related 100 and 110 saloons, but with only two doors and a distinctive fastback rear. During most of its production period, the 110R featured four headlights, but in the earliest years it had only two. Production ended in 1980 to make way for its successor, the Škoda Garde (the Coupe-based version of the Škoda 105/120 series), which was introduced in November 1981.

In motorsport, this basic configuration was punched out to make the rally-specific homologation 130 RS, and one-off 1.8-liter OHC 180RS and 2.0-liter OHC 200RS specials. The ultimate evolution came in 1975, Bořivoj Kořínek’s fuel-injected, 250hp 2000 MI “Grenade.”

Gallery

References

0110R Coupe
Cars introduced in 1970
Cars powered by rear-mounted 4-cylinder engines
Coupés
Cars discontinued in 1980